Håkan Eriksson (born 20 August 1961) is a Swedish orienteering competitor. He received a silver medal in the relay at the 1989 World Orienteering Championships in Skövde, and received a bronze medal in 1999.  He received a silver medal in the sprint event at the  World Orienteering Championships in 2004.

Eriksson won the Swedish 5-days event O-Ringen in 1983, and again in 1991.

References

External links
 
 

1961 births
Living people
Swedish orienteers
Male orienteers
Foot orienteers
World Orienteering Championships medalists
20th-century Swedish people
21st-century Swedish people